Rajesh Talwar is a lawyer and writer from India. He has written several books on the topics of law and human rights.

Early life

Talwar studied economics at Hindu College at the University of Delhi. Subsequently, he went to the University of Nottingham after going to the UK on a British Chevening scholarship in 1996. He received his LL.M in Human Rights Law. He has also participated in a programme on Negotiation at the Harvard Kennedy School of Government studied Forced Migration at the University of Oxford and been awarded a Post Graduate Diploma from the London School of Journalism. He began working for the United Nations in various capacities. His work with the U.N. took him to places such as Kosovo, Afghanistan, Timor-Leste, Somalia and Liberia.

Career
Talwar is both a practitioner and professor of law. He has previously taught LL.B students at both Delhi University and Jamia Millia Islamia.

Talwar's career in writing includes writing on different subjects for major media outlets including The Guardian, The Economic Times, The Sunday Mail, The New Indian Express, The Times of India NIE' and The Pioneer. He has also published books on the topic of law, addressing law reform as well as trying to demystify the subject such as in 'How to Choose a Lawyer – and Win Your Case.'

Talwar's novels include An Afghan Winter and The Sentimental Terrorist, both based in Afghanistan, where he spent many years as a UN staffer. Kirkus Reviews describes the latter novel as 'a compelling narrative' that 'will haunt the readers long after the last page.' Talwar's most recent children's book is a play on human rights titled 'The Boy Who Wrote a Constitution' based on the childhood of Dr B R Ambedkar, the chief architect of the Indian Constitution. Another recent children's book is titled 'Fabulous Four Battle Zoozoo the Wizard' which has indigenous characters and uses Eastern story telling magic. His other children's books include The Three Greens (Orient BlackSwan) and The Bearded Prince. According to Mark Mclaughlin, writing for foreword Reviews, in the latter story, 'without including magic, witches, curses, violence, or villains of any sort,' the author 'has lovingly crafted a short but big-hearted tale of a princess choosing a suitor.' His novels also include Inglistan (2007), which a reviewer for The Hindu called "sometimes tedious but readable", while a reviewer for the Book Review Literary Trust said it was "a autobiographical sounding and rather uninteresting personal account, with all the signs of an amateurish self-expiation". Talwar has also written plays, including Gandhi, Ambedkar and the Four-Legged Scorpion a historical play on the theme of untouchability, High Fidelity Transmission on discriminatory policies and illegal testing of AIDS vaccines in India and the 2001 satire Inside Gayland that depicted an Indian heterosexual man who visited a planet where heterosexuality is against the law as immoral and unnatural.

A non-fiction work Courting Injustice: The Nirbhaya Case and Its Aftermath'' (Hay House) is based on the December 2012 Delhi gang rape case. Most recently in non-fiction he has published 'The Vanishing of Subhash Bose: The Mystery Unlocked' that provides a fresh perspective on the life and alleged death in an air crash of the freedom fighter  Recent publications also include 'The Killing of Aarushi and the Murder of Justice' where he has spoken about the poor quality of evidence that was tendered, the bias in the media and how the case mirrors injustice in thousands of other cases. In fiction he has also published 'How to Kill a Billionaire' (Juggernaut Books; 2016) The novel, released in paperback in 2020 is a literary thriller, with court room scenes that take the reader through the labyrinthine corridors of the Indian legal system.

In the middle of 2021, Rajesh Talwar's book 'Star-Crossed Lovers in the Blue: Love in the Time of Corona' was published which featured a romance in the world of merfolk, the humanoid aquatic creatures. The novel portrayed the story of Utir, a mermaid and Arj, a merman who reside in the Newada Sea. They fall in love, suffer heartbreak, and meet again after many years. Meanwhile, a corona like epidemic attacks the merfolk community. In the later part of 2021 a second romance novel titled 'Guilty of Love, Your Honour' was published.

In the early part of 2022, Talwar wrote a self-help and motivational book titled 'The Mantra and Meaning of Success.'

This was followed by 'The Boy Who Wrote a Constitution' released on 14 April 2022 Dr B R Ambedkar's birth anniversary. The play received extensive media coverage, being a fictional drama based on the childhood on Dr B R Ambedkar who was the chief architect to the Indian Constitution.

Towards the end of 2022, two novellas written by Rajesh Talwar were released titled ‘How I Became a Taliban Assassin & The Murder that Wasn’t’. While the first novella is Talwar’s third fictional work on Afghanistan, the second
novella was derived from the facts in the Aarushi Talwar case. 

On 30 January 2023, Rajesh Talwar’s latest children’s book was published titled
‘The Boy Who Became the Mahatma’. This is written out in the form of a play which is focused on the childhood years on Mohandas Karamchand Gandhi and his relationship with his mother, father and wife. It goes on to discuss his
life as a young barrister fighting discrimination in South African and finally dwells on his years in India trying to unify the nation even as he battles against British colonialism.

As an author and commentator, Rajesh Talwar has been interviewed by The New York Times on the state of justice in India. His work has been featured and described in the following terms by reviewers of his recent book releases:

‘Author Rajesh Talwar is a multi-faceted personality’ – Rajkumari Sharma Tankha, writing for the New Indian Express, 23 September 2020

‘To negotiate this complicated terrain, Talwar has got the right credentials,’ Governance Now, 13 March 2021

‘Rajesh’s rich body of work ranges from social justice and culture to law. His recent plays include Kaash Kashmir, which examines the conflict in the valley.’
Swati Sharma, writing for the Deccan Chronicle, 4 November 2020

‘Enid Blyton had gifted children across the world with Secret Seven and Famous Five. Rajesh has created what Indian children missed, a connection to those characters.’ News 18, 2 October 2020

‘Talwar focuses on the power dynamics among Bose, MK Gandhi and Jawaharlal Nehru.’ The Telegraph, 5 February 2021

Rajesh Talwar has also been a speaker at many forums including for instance at the Federation of Indian Chambers of Commerce and Industry (FICCI, the Kalinga Literary Festival, at Literati, the Chandigarh Literary Festival, and the Pune International Literary Festival.

References

External links
 Rajesh Talwar official website
 Boloji author profile for Rajesh Talwar

Living people
British writers of Indian descent
Alumni of the London School of Journalism
Alumni of the University of Nottingham
Year of birth missing (living people)
Chevening Scholars